Rafiq Uddin Bhuiyan (25 January 1928 - 23 March 1996) was a Bangladesh Awami League politician and the former member of parliament from undivided Mymensingh-13 and for Mymensingh-9 in 1986. He was the organizer of the Liberation War of Bangladesh.

Career
Bhuiyan was a member of the first parliament of Bangladesh.  He was elected to parliament from Mymensingh-13 as a Bangladesh Awami League candidate in 1973. He was elected to parliament from Mymensingh-9 as a Bangladesh Awami League candidate in 1986. He was the president of the Mymensingh District unit of the Bangladesh Awami League.

References

Awami League politicians
1928 births
1st Jatiya Sangsad members
3rd Jatiya Sangsad members
1996 deaths
Bangladesh Krishak Sramik Awami League central committee members